Aphonopelma moreae otherwise known as Mexican jade fuego tarantula is a spider first described by Andrew Smith in 1995. It is named after Barbara Moore, who is the President of the American Arachnological Society. As its common name may suggest it is found in Mexico, in the state of Sonora, south of Yécora. This tarantula is sometimes kept as pet, though the price is usually very high. This is a terrestrial tarantula, which sometimes digs intricate burrows.

Description 
This tarantula's legs are a metallic blue, getting to be almost black in some areas, covered in long slender reddish hairs. The carapace and chelicerae are a metallic blueish-green color. With the opisthosoma being black, covered with long reddish hairs. Somewhat resembling Chromatopelma cyaneopubescens in the coloration, although it is way more hairy. Females get to live about 20 years, while males only live to about 8 years.

Habitat 
Yécora has subtropical highland climate, and is located in the Sierra Madre Occidental, it has average temperatures of 14 °C, with an average yearly rainfall of 1,023mm. It is mainly deciduous forest in unison with coniferous and pine forests, with plants such as Pochote and Cyrtocarpa procera. This area also owns a wide range of animals such as ocelots, lynx, and California Spiny Tailed Iguanas.

References 

mooreae
Spiders of Mexico
Spiders described in 1995
Spiders of Central America